Diego Orlando Benaglio (born 8 September 1983) is a Swiss former footballer who played as a goalkeeper.

He spent most of his professional career with Stuttgart and Wolfsburg in Germany's top flight, the Bundesliga, winning the 2009 league championship and appearing in almost 300 competitive matches with the latter club. He also played three years in Portugal earlier in his career, with Nacional.

Benaglio earned 61 caps for Switzerland, representing the nation in three World Cups and Euro 2008.

Club career

Early years and Nacional
Born in Zürich, Benaglio finished his development at hometown club Grasshopper Club Zürich. Still in his teens he moved to Germany and joined VfB Stuttgart, but appeared exclusively for the reserves during his three-year spell.

Benaglio joined Portugal's C.D. Nacional for the 2005–06 season, soon gaining favour over Henrique Hilário and becoming the Madeirans's undisputed first choice after the veteran left for Chelsea. It was also during his first year that the team qualified for the UEFA Cup.

Wolfsburg

On 22 January 2008, Benaglio returned to Germany, signing for VfL Wolfsburg. He made his debut eight days later, helping his side advance to the quarter-finals of the German Cup after a penalty shootout win over FC Schalke 04.

Benaglio only missed three matches in the 2008–09 campaign as the Wolves were crowned Bundesliga champions for the first time in their 64-year history. The following year he appeared significantly less, due to injury.

On 23 January 2013, Benaglio signed a contract extension to keep him at the Volkswagen Arena until 2016. When the club won its first domestic cup on 30 May 2015, against Borussia Dortmund, he made late saves from Shinji Kagawa and Pierre-Emerick Aubameyang to ensure the 3–1 victory.

Benaglio played once for VfL Wolfsburg II in the amateur Regionalliga Nord while recovering from injury on 5 September 2015, in a 6–1 home defeat of TSV Havelse.

Monaco
On 16 June 2017, 33-year-old Benaglio joined AS Monaco FC on a three-year deal. He debuted on 13 September in a 1–1 draw away to RB Leipzig in the group phase of the UEFA Champions League, and made his Ligue 1 bow three days later in a 3–0 home win against RC Strasbourg Alsace.

Benaglio made 39 appearances across all competitions for the team from the principality. He and fellow goalkeepers Danijel Subašić and Seydou Sy were all released in June 2020.

On 18 August 2020, Benaglio announced his retirement from professional football.

International career

A Swiss international since 2006, Benaglio was called up for the 2006 FIFA World Cup as third choice behind Pascal Zuberbühler and Fabio Coltorti, making his debut in a pre-tournament friendly against China on 3 June. With consistently good club performances the following years, he was promoted to the starting line-up for UEFA Euro 2008 played on home soil, and became the starter subsequently.

As the national team qualified to the 2010 World Cup in South Africa, Benaglio played all three group stage matches in an eventual group stage exit, conceding only one goal. This included a 1–0 victory over Spain, who later won the tournament.

Benaglio captained the Swiss team at the 2012 Olympics, and played nine times during the 2014 World Cup qualification campaign, keeping six clean sheets. On 2 June 2014, he was named in the full side's list for the World Cup finals by national coach Ottmar Hitzfeld, saving a penalty kick from Karim Benzema in the second match but in a 2–5 defeat by France.

On 20 August 2014, Benaglio announced his retirement from international football.

Career statistics

Club

1 Includes DFB Pokal matches. 
2 Includes Europa League and Champions League matches. 
3 Includes DFL-Supercup and relegation play-off matches. 
4 Although still a second-team regular, Benaglio made his first-team debut that season in the UEFA Cup.

International

Honours
Wolfsburg
Bundesliga: 2008–09
DFB-Pokal: 2014–15
DFL-Supercup: 2015

References

External links

 

1983 births
Living people
Footballers from Zürich
Swiss men's footballers
Association football goalkeepers
Swiss Super League players
FC Baden players
Grasshopper Club Zürich players
Primeira Liga players
C.D. Nacional players
Bundesliga players
Regionalliga players
VfB Stuttgart II players
VfB Stuttgart players
VfL Wolfsburg players
VfL Wolfsburg II players
Ligue 1 players
AS Monaco FC players
Switzerland youth international footballers
Switzerland under-21 international footballers
Switzerland international footballers
2006 FIFA World Cup players
UEFA Euro 2008 players
2010 FIFA World Cup players
2014 FIFA World Cup players
Olympic footballers of Switzerland
Footballers at the 2012 Summer Olympics
Swiss expatriate footballers
Expatriate footballers in Germany
Expatriate footballers in Portugal
Expatriate footballers in Monaco
Swiss expatriate sportspeople in Germany
Swiss expatriate sportspeople in Portugal
Swiss expatriate sportspeople in Monaco
Swiss people of Italian descent